Season two of So You Think You Can Dance Australia, the Australian version of the American reality dance-off series So You Think You Can Dance, is hosted by former Rogue Traders vocalist and solo artist Natalie Bassingthwaighte, with Jason Coleman, Matt Lee and Bonnie Lythgoe acting as the judges. It premiered on 1 February 2009. Talia Fowler was announced as the winner on 26 April 2009.

Overview
Auditions for the second season were held between September and November 2008 in Perth, Brisbane, Melbourne, Adelaide and Sydney. Judges hope that season 2 will see more industry dancers auditioning after the favourable response to the first season of the show.

Nigel Lythgoe will make an appearance in this season as a guest judge. He only appeared in the Top 100 week of the auditions. Also, neither Nigel Lythgoe or Bonnie Lythgoe sat next to each other during that stage of auditions due to their divorce in 2007.

Finals

Top 20 Contestants

Female Contestants

Male Contestants

Results table
 	

 *Penny was forced to leave So You Think You Can Dance. Penny injured her ribs during a lift in her and Ben's top 10 foxtrot and scans on Tuesday revealed that she not only had bruising but a stress fracture. The dancer who will replace Penny is Gianne.

Performances
Green background means the couple won the "McDonald's I'm lovin it Performance of the Night" for their dance.

Week 1 (15 February 2009)
Judges: Jason Coleman, Bonnie Lythgoe and Matt Lee

Week 2 (22 February 2009)
Judges: Jason Coleman, Bonnie Lythgoe, Matt Lee and Jason Gilkison

Week 3 (1 March 2009)
Judges: Jason Coleman, Bonnie Lythgoe and Matt Lee

Week 4 (8 March 2009)
Judges: Jason Coleman, Bonnie Lythgoe, Matt Lee and Mary Murphy

Week 5 (15 March 2009)
Judges: Jason Coleman, Bonnie Lythgoe, Matt Lee and Kelley Abbey

Week 6 (22 March 2009)
Judges: Jason Coleman, Bonnie Lythgoe, and Matt Lee

Week 7 (29 March 2009)
Judges: Jason Coleman, Bonnie Lythgoe, Matt Lee and Jason Gilkison

Note:According to the So You Think You Can Dance Australia website Penny was forced to leave. Penny injured her ribs during a lift in Sunday night’s foxtrot and scans on Tuesday revealed that she not only had bruising but a stress fracture. Pursuant to the rules, Gianne Abbot, as the last female dancer eliminated, was brought back into the competition. With this, Penny became the first contestant that never had the chance to perform a Solo in the entire run of the series.

Week 8 (5 April 2009)
Judges: Jason Coleman, Bonnie Lythgoe, Matt Lee

Week 9: Top 20 Easter Special  (12 April 2009)

This week was an "Easter Celebration," special performance show.  As a result, there was no competing or voting.  The Top 20 returned to perform new dances and all previous group dances were shown again.  The Top 4 provided commentary on the group dances and the choreographers.

 Guest performers (encores)
 The Australian Ballet
 Complexions Contemporary Ballet
 Note: Penny was unable to perform a new routine due to her existing injury and an encore of her week 3 contemporary performance with Charlie was shown.

Week 10 (19 April 2009)
Judges: Jason Coleman, Bonnie Lythgoe, Matt Lee

 Solos

Result shows

Week 1 (16 February 2009)
 Group Dance: Ida Corr vs Fedde Le Grand - "Let Me Think About It" (Jazz; Choreographer: Kelley Abbey)
 Guest Dancers: Sydney Dance Company
 Musical Guests: Sam Sparro - "21st Century Life" with Top 20 contestants
 McDonald's i'm lovin' it performance of the night: Penny Higgs & Charlie Bartley
 Solos

 Eliminated
 Jesse Rasmussen
 Max Francisco
 New Partners
 None

Week 2 (23 February 2009)
 Group Dance: Shakira - "Objection (Tango)" (Rock and Roll/Latin Ballroom; Choreographer: Jason Gilkison)
 Guest Performers: Wind of Shaolin
 Musical Guests: Cassie Davis - "Like It Loud"
 McDonald's i'm lovin' it performance of the night: Gianne Abbot & BJ Rorke
 Solos

 Eliminated
 Ash-Leigh Hunter
 Stephen Tannos
 New Partners
 None

Week 3 (2 March 2009)
 Group Dance: Kevin Rudolf ft. Lil Wayne - "Let It Rock" (Hip-Hop; Choreographer: Tiana Joubert)
 Guest Performers: Complexions Contemporary Ballet
 Musical Guests: Lily Allen - "The Fear"
 McDonald's i'm lovin' it performance of the night: Amy Campbell & Damien Samuel
 Solos

 Eliminated:
 Emmanuel Rodriguez
 Chanelle Johnson
 New Partners:
 Talia Fowler & Loredo Malcolm

Week 4 (9 March 2009)
 Group Dance: James Morrison - "You Make It Real" (Contemporary; Choreographer: Juliette Verne)
 Guest Performers: None
 Musical Guests: Kaz James Feat. Macy Gray - "Can't Hold Back"
 McDonald's i'm lovin' it performance of the night: Talia Fowler & Loredo Malcolm
 Solos

 Eliminated:
 Pania Taku
 Damien Samuel
 New Partners:
 Amy Campbell & Ben Veitch

Week 5 (16 March 2009)
 Group Dance: Gotan Project - "Mi Confesión" (Jazz; Choreographer: Kelley Abbey)
 Guest Performers: Australian Dance Theatre
 Musical Guests: Wes Carr - "Feels Like Woah"
 McDonald's I'm lovin' it performance of the night: Talia Fowler & Loredo Malcolm (Jazz)
 Solos

 Eliminated:
 Danny Golding
 Lamb Iovine
 New Partners:
 None. Now that only the top ten remain, new partners are randomly assigned each week

Week 6 (23 March 2009)
 Group Dance: Madonna - "Music Inferno" (Disco; Choreographer: Project Moda - Shannon Holtzapffel & Simon Lind)
 Guest Performers: The Australian Ballet
 Musical Guests: The Fray - "You Found Me"
 McDonald's I'm lovin' it performance of the night: Amy Campbell & BJ Rorke (Contemporary)
 Solos

 Eliminated:
 Loredo Malcolm
 Withdrew:
Penny Higgs

Week 7 (30 March 2009)
 Group Dance: Robbie Williams - "Ain't That A Kick In The Head" (Foxtrot; Choreographer: Jason Gilkison)
 Guest Performers: The Australian Ballet
 Musical Guests: Kaiser Chiefs - "Never Miss A Beat"
 McDonald's I'm lovin' it performance of the night: Kat Risteska & BJ Rorke (Ballroom - Foxtrot)
 Solos

 Eliminated:
 Gianne Abbot
 Timomatic Omaji

Week 8 (6 April 2009)
 Group Dance: Justice - "Genesis"/Daft Punk - "Robot Rock" (Hip Hop; Choreographer: Tabitha & Napoleon)
 Guest Performers: Stomp
 Musical Guests: Duffy - "Rain On Your Parade"
 McDonald's I'm lovin' it performance of the night: Talia Fowler & BJ Rorke (Hip Hop)
 Solos

 Eliminated
Kat Risteska
BJ Rorke

Week 11 Finale (26 April 2009)
Group dances: "Everybody’s Free (To Feel Good)" — Global Deejays (TBC; Choreographers: TBC) with the contestants who auditioned from Season 1 and Season 2
Musical Guest: "TBC"—TBC
Judge's choice: 
4th Place
Ben Veitch
3rd Place
Amy Campbell
Runner-Up:
Charlie Bartley
Winner:
Talia Fowler

Ratings

References

External links
 

2009 Australian television seasons
Season 02